The 2015 Fenland District Council election took place on 7 May 2015 to elect members of the Fenland District Council in England. It was held on the same day as other local elections. It used the new boundaries from The Fenland (Electoral Changes) Order 2014.

Results Summary

Wards

Bassenhally (Whittlesey)

Benwick, Coated and Eastrea (2 seats)

Benwick, Coates and Eastrea 

Birch (Chatteris)

Birch (Chatteris) 

Clarkson (Wisbech)

Clarkson (Wisbech) 

Doddington and Wimblington (2 seats)

Doddington and Wimblington

Elm and Christchurch (2 seats)

Elm and Christchurch 

Kirgate (Wisbech)

Kirkgate (Wisbech)

Lattersey (Whittlesey)

Manea

Manea  

March East (3 seats)

March North (3 seats)

March West (3 seats)

Medworth (Wisbech)

Octavia Hill (Wisbech)

Parson Drove and Wisbech St Mary (2 seats)

Peckover (Wisbech)

Roman Bank (3 seats)

Slade Lode (Chatteris)

Slade Lode (Chatteris) 

St Andrews (Whittlesey)

Staithe (Wisbech)

Stonald (Whittlesey)

The Mills (Chatteris)

The Mills  (Chatteris) 

Waterlees Village (Wisbech)

Wenneye (Chatteris)

References

2015 English local elections
May 2015 events in the United Kingdom
2015
2010s in Cambridgeshire